The Hills Cricket Club is a cricket club in Skerries, Dublin Ireland, playing in Division 1 of the Leinster Senior League.

The club was established in 1969, winning the LeinsterJunior Cup and Junior League in 1971, Intermediate Cup in 1972 and Intermediate League in 1973. Senior status was attained in 1983 and a first senior trophies – the Leinster Senior Cup and Leinster Senior League – came in 1989.

On 1 September 2012, the club won their first Irish Senior Cup defeating Merrion Cricket Club by 8 wickets in Castle Avenue, Clontarf.

Honours
Irish Senior Cup: 2
2012, 2014
Leinster Senior League: 3
1989, 2008, 2013
Leinster Senior Cup: 5
1989, 1996, 2005, 2006, 2017, 2019

References

External links
The Hills Cricket Club

Cricket clubs in County Dublin
Leinster Senior League (cricket) teams
1969 establishments in Ireland
Cricket clubs established in 1969
Sports clubs in Fingal